Kurumbalapperi is a village in Tenkasi district, Tamil Nadu.

It is on the way from Tenkasi to Tirunelveli. Years ago there was a lot of kurumbala (a small jackfruit) trees, so the village got the name Kurumbalapperi. Most of the people work in agriculture. There is a big temple which is called Pathirakali Amman Koil.

External links 
 https://web.archive.org/web/20121016013226/http://www.kurumbaiamman.com/

Villages in Tirunelveli district